Gürçayır can refer to:

 Gürçayır, Ardahan
 Gürçayır, Hınıs